Hui Ruoqi (born 4 March 1991) is a former Chinese volleyball player. She is the Outside Hitter and the fifteenth Captain of China women's national volleyball team, and plays for Jiangsu. She retired in 2018.

Early life 
On March 4, 1991, Hui was born in Dalian. Her parents are Hui Fei (惠飞) and Xu Xueyuan (许雪媛). She has a sister Hui Ruoxuan (惠若璇) who is ten years her junior. Both of her parents were keen volleyball players when they were young.

When Hui was 9, her family moved and settled in Nanjing.

Hui is the alumnus of Nanjing No.29 Middle School and received her master's degree in physical education from Nanjing Normal University in 2017. She then started at the same university as a PhD student.

Career
She started playing volleyball in elementary school in Nanjing. In 2006, she was chosen for the Jiangsu professional team. In 2007, she was selected for the national team. She was part of the Team China that won gold at the 2016 Summer Olympics.

Endorsement
Since 2017, Hui has been a spokeswoman of Adidas.

Awards

Individuals
 2012 Asian Women's Cup Volleyball Championship "Best Server"

Clubs
 2013 Club World Championship -  Bronze medal, with Guangdong Evergrande

See also
China at the 2012 Summer Olympics#Volleyball
Volleyball at the 2012 Summer Olympics – Women's tournament

References

External links
FIVB Profile

Chinese women's volleyball players
2016 Olympic gold medalists for China
Olympic gold medalists for China in volleyball
Volleyball players at the 2012 Summer Olympics
Volleyball players at the 2016 Summer Olympics
Nanjing Normal University alumni
Volleyball players from Dalian
1991 births
Living people
Outside hitters
21st-century Chinese women